Pitney is a surname but can be used as a first name as well. Notable people with the surname include:

Arthur Pitney (1871–1933), inventor
Gene Pitney (1940–2006), American singer-songwriter
 Woody Pitney (born c. 1991), singer-songwriter
 Mo Pitney (born c. 1993) singer-songwriter
Jack Pitney (1963–2010), American marketing executive
John Oliver Halstead Pitney, co-founder of the law firm Pitney & Hardin
Mahlon Pitney (1858–1924), jurist and politician
Nico Pitney (born c. 1982), American journalist
Pat Pitney (born 1965), American university president and Olympic gold medalist